Gallo Cliff Dwelling is a pair of Ancestral Puebloan room blocks that lie under a cliff in Gallo Canyon, New Mexico. Located adjacent to the National Park Service campground, the site includes a central room that features a multi-storied wall and a five-room structure with kiva that was probably occupied during the early 12th century by Mesa Veredans, who built in a distinctive McElmo masonry style. The inhabitants of these dwellings dates from 1150 to 1200 AD, or the late Chacoan Period. National Park Service excavations there during the 1960s uncovered a quantity of perishable items, including sandals and baskets, from the rooms.

The Gallo Cliff Dwellings lie on the outskirts of a group of houses, Chacoan Great Houses, lived in by farmers. These people worked on nearby fields to provide food for their families. There is a campground nearby called Gallo Campground and is a great place for camping if you are interested in touring the site. Petroglyphs are carved into many of the faces of the cliffs. Many are too faint to determine what the image was intended to be, but the most common, discernable image are bear paws. These are considered a clan symbol, marking the territory of its members.

Next to the cliffs is a valley, and then the Fajada Butte. On one side of this hill is a huge ramp that connects to a place where a calendar was made. It is called the Sun Dagger and keeps track of the way the sun and moon moves. It is believed that this calendar helped the Chacoans follow yearly solstices.

These dwellings are very helpful in giving a better look into the lives of the Chacoan people and how they had to adapt to the changing environment around them. As avid farmers who depended on their fields for food, they needed to move when the soil could no longer provide the nutrients for their crops. Nowadays, there are techniques of rotating crops, but back then there was no such strategy. These people would travel, find new places to plant their crops, and build new houses.

See also
List of the oldest buildings in New Mexico

References

Bibliography
 "Gjhikes.com: Gallo Cliff Dwelling." Gjhikes.com: Gallo Cliff Dwelling. N.p., n.d. Web. <http://www.gjhikes.com/2015/01/gallo-cliff-dwelling.html>.

Archaeological sites in New Mexico
Chaco Canyon
Chaco Culture National Historical Park
Colorado Plateau
Ancestral Puebloans
Post-Archaic period in North America
Native American history of New Mexico